Eagle Township is one of the seventeen townships of Hancock County, Ohio, United States. As of the 2010 census the population was 1,084, down from 1,195 at the 2000 census.

Geography
Located in the central part of the county, it borders the following townships:
Liberty Township - north
Marion Township - northeast corner
Jackson Township - east
Madison Township - southeast
Van Buren Township - south
Orange Township - southwest corner
Union Township - west
Blanchard Township - northwest corner

No municipalities are located in Eagle Township.

Name and history
Statewide, other Eagle Townships are located in Brown and Vinton counties.

Government
The township is governed by a three-member board of trustees, who are elected in November of odd-numbered years to a four-year term beginning on the following January 1. Two are elected in the year after the presidential election and one is elected in the year before it. There is also an elected township fiscal officer, who serves a four-year term beginning on April 1 of the year after the election, which is held in November of the year before the presidential election. Vacancies in the fiscal officership or on the board of trustees are filled by the remaining trustees.

References

External links

Townships in Hancock County, Ohio
Townships in Ohio